Stealth conservative individuals or organizations are those whom some perceive to present themselves as progressive, liberal, or moderate while using that status to forward a so-called "conservative agenda".  According to journalist Laura Flanders:
This is the new face of the radical right. The attractive right-wingers who talk about 'choice' and 'civil rights' pose a threat to progressives who support the federal government’s role as a protector of individual citizens.

Christian Coalition leader Ralph Reed has openly advocated a policy of stealth politics by the right.  In a March 1992 interview with the Los Angeles Times, Reed stated "It's like guerrilla warfare.  If you reveal your location, all it does is allow your opponent to improve his artillery bearings. It's better to move quietly, with stealth, under the cover of night."

References
Faludi, Susan. 1995. I'm not a feminist but I play one on TV. Ms. 5:30-39
Article on "Anti-Feminist Feminists"

Conservatism